Karen Nunez-Tesheira was the Minister of Finance of Trinidad and Tobago from 2007 to 2010. Her government was defeated by Kamla Persad-Bissessar of the UNC in the 2010 Trinidad and Tobago general election.

References

Living people 
Year of birth missing (living people)
Trinidad and Tobago people of Grenadian descent
Place of birth missing (living people)